The Irena Szewińska Memorial is an annual track and field meeting held at the Zdzislaw Krzyszkowiak Stadium in Bydgoszcz, Poland in July.

The meeting was part of the inaugural 2020 World Athletics Continental Tour on bronze level and reached gold standard at the tour in 2021.

Meet records

Men

Women

Notes

See also
Sport in Poland

References

European Athletic Association meetings
Athletics competitions in Poland
Monuments and memorials in Poland